The 18th NKP Salve Challenger Trophy was a domestic cricket tournament that was held in Rajkot from 29 September to 2 October 2012. The series involved the domestic teams from India which were India A, India B, and Bengal. The tournament was won by India B who defeated India A by 139 runs.

Squads

Matches

Group stage

Final

References

2012 in cricket